Anil Bhardwaj (born 2 January 1954) is an Indian former cricketer. He played first-class cricket for Delhi and Orissa.

See also
 List of Delhi cricketers

References

External links
 

1954 births
Living people
Indian cricketers
Delhi cricketers
Odisha cricketers
Cricketers from Delhi